Parker S. Davis (January 4, 1863 – December 18, 1955) was an American politician who served as Mayor of Beverly, Massachusetts, and was a member of the Massachusetts House of Representatives.

Early life
Davis was born on January 4, 1863, in East Boston. He attended school in Beverly and graduated from Comer's Commercial College of Boston in 1881.

Political career
In 1897, Davis was a member of the Beverly common council. From 1898 to 1900 he was a member of the board of aldermen, first as the member from ward 1 (1898 to 1899), then as an at-large member (1900). From 1903 to 1904 he was Mayor of Beverly. In 1910, he represented the 20th Essex District in the Massachusetts House of Representatives. As a member of the House, Davis introduced a bill to reduced the legal weight for a loaf of bread from 32 ounces to 28 ounces.

Business career
A shoe operator by trade, Davis later became a real estate dealer who specialized in house lots. He was also an incorporator and trustee of the Beverly Savings Bank.

Death
Cole died on December 18, 1955, at the age of 92.

Note
1. The 20th Essex District sent two representatives to the Massachusetts House of Representatives. In 1911, Herman A. MacDonald and John L. Saltonstall Sr. succeeded Davis and A. Preston Chase.

References

1863 births
1955 deaths
Mayors of Beverly, Massachusetts
Republican Party members of the Massachusetts House of Representatives
People from East Boston, Boston